Wallace Ralston Westlake (August 27, 1907 – December 9, 1978) was an American politician of the Republican Party from the U.S. state of Ohio. He was the 47th mayor of Columbus, Ohio and the 43rd person to serve in that office. He served one term in office until he lost re-election in the 1963 mayoral election by former mayor Jack Sensenbrenner.

He served in the US Army during World War II, was a member of the Lutheran Church, the Freemasons and the Shriners. He was born in the Hilltop neighborhood in Columbus on South Highland Avenue and lived in that area throughout his life. As an adult, he lived in a two-story home located at 3300 West Broad Street, where he also owned a small motel and glass business for many years. The property was later sold, and the vacant land behind it was converted to self-storage units, and the motel units were converted to small offices. He died on December 9, 1978.

References

Bibliography

Further reading

External links

Wallace Ralston Westlake at Political Graveyard

Mayors of Columbus, Ohio
American Lutherans
1907 births
1978 deaths
Ohio Republicans
Columbus City Council members
United States Army personnel of World War II
Burials at Green Lawn Cemetery (Columbus, Ohio)
20th-century American politicians
20th-century Lutherans